Frances is an unincorporated community in Pacific County, Washington, United States.  Frances is located along State Route 6 east of the community of Lebam.  Frances and surrounding areas are part of an area heavily affected by the logging industry.

References

Unincorporated communities in Pacific County, Washington
Unincorporated communities in Washington (state)